Opart 369 is a female professional volleyball team based in Nonthaburi Thailand. The club was founded in 2018 and plays in the

Honours

Domestic competitions 

 Women's Volleyball Pro Challenge
 Champion (1) : 2018

Former names 

Opart 369 (2018–present)

Team colors 
Thailand League

    (2018–present)

Thai-Denmark Super League

    (2018–present)

League results

Team roster 2019–20

Head coach

Team Captain 

  Arisa Promnok (2018–Present)

Notable players 
Domestic Players

 Sutina Pasang
 Yuwalee Choksamai
 Phitchayaphak Dokkulab
 Sumalai Prasopsuk
 Pannapa Chanpuk

References

External links 

 Official website

Volleyball clubs in Thailand
Women's volleyball teams